Mr. A–Z is the second album by the American singer-songwriter Jason Mraz, released on July 26, 2005. It is the follow-up to his first album Waiting for My Rocket to Come, released in 2002. Even with mixed reviews, it was a moderate commercial success and debuted at number 5 on Billboard's Top 200 albums chart. It was recognized for mixing many different genres of music together.

It was nominated by the Recording Academy for best engineered album, and the producer Steve Lillywhite, who previously worked with U2, Dave Matthews Band and The Rolling Stones, won for Producer of the Year, but not for his work on Mr. A–Z. The name of the album is a play on the artist's surname, "Mraz".

An opera solo performed by Mraz himself can be found on the track "Mr. Curiosity". In March 2010, this song charted in Germany after it had been performed by Lena Meyer-Landrut in the talent show contest Unser Star für Oslo (Our Star for Oslo), reaching a peak position of number 44.

Formats
In the United States and Europe, the album was released both as a CD and as a DualDisc. The DualDisc version has enhanced packaging and an extra booklet.

In July 2022, the album was reissued for the first time on vinyl, pressed to 2 LPs on both black and limited edition translucent blue vinyl versions.

Track listing

Personnel
Jason Mraz – lead vocals on all tracks, acoustic guitar on all tracks, electric guitar on all tracks

Additional personnel

Ian Sheridan – bass guitar on tracks 1, 4, 5, 6, 7, 8, 9, 10, 11 and 12, backing vocals on track 4
Bill Bell – guitar on tracks 1, 4, 5, 6, 7, 8, 9, 10, 11 and 12, backing vocals on track 4
Adam King – drums on tracks 1, 4, 5, 6, 7, 8, 9, 10, 11 and 12, backing vocals on track 4
Eric Hinojosa – keyboards on tracks 1, 4, 5, 6, 7, 8, 9, 10, 11 and 12, backing vocals on track 4, programming on track 8
Raul Rekow – congas on tracks 1, 4, 5, 6, 7, 8, 9, 10, 11 and 12, percussion on tracks 1, 4, 5, 6, 7, 8, 9, 10, 11 and 12
Karl Perazzo – timbales on tracks 1, 4, 5, 6, 7, 8, 9, 10, 11 and 12, percussion on tracks 1, 4, 5, 6, 7, 8, 9, 10, 11 and 12
Jack Daley – bass guitar on track 2
Lyle Workman – electric guitar on tracks 2 and 3, Dobro resonator guitar on tracks 2 and 3
Nir "Nir Z" Zidkyahu – drums on track 2
Roger Joseph Manning, Jr. – keyboards on track 2 and 3, Moog bass synthesizer on track 3
Bashiri Johnson – percussion on track 2
Mike Elizondo – bass guitar on track 3
Ahmir "?uestlove" Thompson – drums on track 3
Steve Sidelnyk – programming on track 3
DJ Bob Necksnapp – scratching and mixing on track 3
Bushwalla – spoken word on track 3
Noel "Toca" Rivera – backing vocals on tracks 4, 10 and 11
Nicole Bayer – cello on track 5

Roxanne Oldham – backing vocals on track 6
Danielle Decker – backing vocals on track 6
Raul Midón – classical guitar on track 7, electric guitar on track 12, faux horn on track 12, backing vocals on track 12
Charlie Mingroni – spoken word on track 8
Dennis Morris – programming on track 9
Lee Davis High School Choir – choir vocals on track 12
Steve Lilywhite – backing vocals on track 6, production on tracks 1, 4, 5, 6, 7, 8, 9, 10, 11 and 12, mixing on tracks 1, 4, 5, 6, 7, 8, 9, 10, 11 and 12
Carl Glanville – engineering on tracks 1, 4, 5, 6, 7, 8, 9, 10, 11 and 12, mixing on tracks 1, 4, 5, 6, 7, 8, 9, 10, 11 and 12
Scott Moore – backing vocals on track 6, engineering assistance on tracks 1, 4, 5, 6, 7, 8, 9, 10, 11 and 12
Matthew Cullen – engineering assistance on tracks 1, 4, 5, 6, 7, 8, 9, 10, 11 and 12
Josh Deutsch – castanets on track 2, production on tracks 2 and 3, executive production on all tracks
Kevin Kadish – acoustic guitar on track 2, production on tracks 2 and 3
Samuel "Vaughn" Merrick – engineering on tracks 2 and 3
David Thoener – mixing on track 2
Jim Scott – mixing on track 3
Ted Jensen – mastering on all tracks

Charts

Certifications

References

2005 albums
Jason Mraz albums
Albums produced by Steve Lillywhite
Atlantic Records albums